Viviez-Decazeville is a railway station in Viviez and near Decazeville, Occitanie, France. The station is on the Capdenac–Rodez line. The station is served by Intercités de nuit (night train) and TER (local) services operated by SNCF.

Train services
The following services currently call at Viviez-Decazeville:
night services (Intercités de nuit) Paris–Orléans–Figeac–Rodez–Albi
local service (TER Occitanie) Brive-la-Gaillarde–Figeac–Rodez

References

Railway stations in Aveyron